Leesburg is an unincorporated community in southwestern Camp County, Texas, United States. Its elevation is 397 feet (121 m). Although Leesburg is unincorporated, it has a post office, with the ZIP code of 75451.

History
Named for early settler John Lee, Leesburg was a contender for the county seat in 1874, coming in second to Pittsburg. In the same year, the community's first post office was established. James G. Credille was the postmaster, as well as the county treasurer. The community became a stop on the East Line and Red River Railroad in the late 1870s. The community had 50 residents in 1884, as well as a mill, a gin, and three stores. It continued to grow during the decade and had a population of 150 in 1890. Six years later, the population boomed to 300 and had two churches and a business center. The population remained at around 300 until it dropped to 120 in 1943 and then to 75 in 1968. It went back up to 115 from 1970 through 2000 and had 18 businesses.

It was the site of the public burning of nineteen-year-old Wylie McNeely in 1921. Five hundred white people gathered to watch McNeely, who was black, be burned alive at a stake by a mob after he was accused of assault by a white girl.

Geography

Education
Leesburg had two schools in 1896. Since 1955, its schools have been consolidated into the Pittsburg Independent School District.

Notable people
Leo Birdine - baseball player.
Carroll Shelby – automotive designer and racing driver, born in Leesburg to Warren Hall Shelby, a mail carrier, and Eloise Lawrence Shelby.

References

Unincorporated communities in Texas
Unincorporated communities in Camp County, Texas